Macedonia made its debut at the Mediterranean Games in Mersin, Turkey from the 20 to 30 of June 2013.

Medals

Medalists

Basketball

Men's tournament

Team 

Marko Simonovski
Darko Sokolov
Dimitar Karadžovski
Bojan Krstevski
Aleksandar Kostoski
Bojan Trajkovski
Stojan Gjuroski
Gorjan Markovski
Aleksandar Šterjov
Vladimir Brčkov
Kristijan Nikolov
Siniša Avramovski

Standings

Results

Football

Men's tournament

Team

Damjan Shishkovski
Igor Aleksovski
Gjoko Zajkov
Riste Karakamishev
Filip Ristevski
Stefan Trajkovikj
Darko Velkovski
Mihajlo Mitrov
Besmir Bojku
Jordancho Naumoski
Demir Imeri
Jasir Asani
Dorian Babunski
Kire Markoski
Kristijan Kostovski
Dimitar Ivanov

Standings

Results

Handball

Men's tournament
1 team of 16 athletes
Preliminary round

Women's tournament
Preliminary round

1 team of 16 athletes

Swimming 

Men

Volleyball

Men's tournament

Standings

Results

References

Nations at the 2013 Mediterranean Games
2013
Mediterranean Games